Lamium maculatum (also known as spotted dead-nettle, spotted henbit and purple dragon) is a species of flowering plant in the family Lamiaceae, native throughout Europe and temperate Asia (Lebanon, Syria, Turkey, western China).

Description 
Lamium maculatum is a prostrate, spreading herbaceous perennial.
This species is very variable in terms of leaf size and shape, hairiness and flower colours. It reaches on average  in height. It has erect, hollow and pubescent stems, branched at the base only. Their shape varies from ovate-triangular to heart-shaped. The flowers of the plant are formed in the leaf axils of the upper leaf pairs. The upper lips of the flowers are helmet-shaped, usually pink or purplish, while the bilobate lower ones are whitish with purple dots. The stamens are located in the upper lip and have orange pollen. The flowering period extends from April through November.

It tends to grow higher in spring while during the colder weather it is much flatter to the ground. If subjected to light frost, L. maculatum will recover in spring as it enters its growth cycle.

Habitat

Cultivation 
Lamium maculatum is valued as groundcover in moist, shady areas.  It will rapidly colonise an area, and may become invasive given suitable growing conditions. Numerous cultivars have been developed, mainly for their coloured and varigated leaves, including:-
 'Album' (white form)
 'Anne Greenaway'(leaves marbled with light and dark green, chartreuse and silver, flowers mauve-pink). 
 'Aureum' (yellow-leaved)
 'Beacon Silver' (silver leaves)
 'Cannon's Gold' (gold leaves)
 'Chequers' (vigorous, silver-striped leaves)
 'Red Nancy' (silver leaves with green margins)
 'Roseum' (leaves with a central silver stripe)
 'Sterling Silver' (silver leaves)
 'White Nancy'

Synonyms

References 

 Pignatti S. - Flora d'Italia - Edagricole – 1982 Vol. II, pg. 456
 Mayhew H. - The criminal prisons of London, and scenes of prison life - 1862, p. 224

External links 
 Flora Europaea: Lamium maculatum
 Biolib
 Plant finder
 Lamium maculatum
 The Plant List

maculatum
Flora of Europe
Flora of Asia
Plants described in 1753
Garden plants
Taxa named by Carl Linnaeus